Tracy Allard  (born 1971) is a Canadian politician who has represented Grande Prairie in the Legislative Assembly of Alberta since 2019. A member of the United Conservative Party (UCP), she served as minister of municipal affairs from August 2020 to January 2021.

Early life
Tracy Allard attended the University of British Columbia completing a Bachelor of Commerce and a certificate in disability management. She and her husband Serge own and operate two Tim Hortons franchises, located in Grande Prairie, Alberta.

Political career 
Allard was selected as the United Conservative candidate in Grande Prairie. She won the seat 2019 Alberta general election, with the UCP also forming government.

In November 2019, Allard was appointed as chairwoman of the Northern Alberta Development Council.

In March 2020, Allard was one of seven people named to a panel of Joint Working Group on Missing and Murdered Indigenous Women and Girls which will work on recommendations for Alberta's action plan regarding the issue.

Allard was appointed as Minister of Municipal Affairs on August 25, 2020, and the former Minister Kaycee Madu was appointed Minister of Justice and Solicitor General.

On October 21, 2020, Allard tested positive for COVID-19.

COVID-19 Controversy

Travel Scandal 
In December 2020, Allard took a family vacation to Hawaii despite federal and provincial government advice to avoid non-essential travel and the border between Canada and the United States being closed. Premier Jason Kenney originally defended Allard stating that such travel was important to protect the travel industry, including Calgary-based Westjet. On January 4, 2021, Allard resigned as Minister of Municipal Affairs over the matter.

Vaccination Campaign 
In September 2021, Allard sent a newsletter to her constituents that encouraged the government to support "natural immunity" which was criticized by the opposition Alberta New Democratic Party.

Electoral history

References

United Conservative Party MLAs
Living people
Women MLAs in Alberta
People from Grande Prairie
21st-century Canadian politicians
Members of the Executive Council of Alberta
Women government ministers of Canada
21st-century Canadian women politicians
1971 births
Missing and Murdered Indigenous Women and Girls movement